Norman Lamont (1780 – 27 April 1834) was a Scottish politician and Army officer.

Born at Monidrain, in Argyllshire, Norman was the second son of Lord John Lamont.  He became a Major in the 91st (Argyllshire Highlanders) Regiment of Foot, serving in the Battle of Waterloo.  At the 1832 UK general election, he stood for the Whigs in Wells, winning the seat.  In Parliament, he argued for the immediate abolition of slavery.  He resigned in April 1834, by taking the Chiltern Hundreds, and died later in the month.

References

1780 births
1834 deaths
British Army officers
People from Argyll and Bute
UK MPs 1832–1835
Whig (British political party) MPs for English constituencies